De West is one of the main newspapers of Suriname.

De West was founded in 1892, and in its early years was a conservative paper that had a somewhat antagonistic rivalry with the left-leaning Suriname, the other leading newspaper in what was then the Dutch colony of Suriname. De West became a daily newspaper in 1950 owned and edited by David George Findlay.

On 25 February 1980, Dési Bouterse led a coup d'état. During the coup a hand grenade was thrown into the offices of De West, and the building was under fire. Luckily the fighting only caused minor damage. The paper was forced to close in the early 1980s following a coup led by Dési Bouterse. It was allowed to reopen in 1984, although still under some government censorship. , it is the second-largest paper by circulation in Suriname, after de Ware Tijd, and takes an independent political stance.

References

External links
 Dagblad De West (in Dutch)

Newspapers established in 1892
Dutch-language newspapers published in South America
Newspapers published in Suriname
1892 establishments in South America
Companies of Suriname